Léman International School Chengdu (LIS) is an for-profit international school at 1080# Da'an Road,  (正兴镇), Shuangliu District, Chengdu, China, within the Tianfu New Area development. It is a part of the Nord Anglia Education (NAE) network.

History 

The school was opened in 2009. The total investment of the school is about 2 million RMB. The school was approved as the international school for foreigners by the Chinese Ministry of Education in December 2011. The school became part of the Nord Anglia Education family of schools in 2015 after NAE acquired it from Meritas LLC . Nord Anglia Education has 76 international schools around the world in Asia, Europe, the Middle East and America. These independent international schools teach over 68,000 students worldwide as of December 2021.

In August 2014 the school received authorization for the International Baccalaureate programme.

In March 2020 the school was authorized for the International Baccalaureate Middle Years Programme.

Campus and location 

Themed events 
The school offers themed events such as Challenge Week, Duke of Edinburgh, Explore China Trip, Literacy Week, Numeracy Week, International Day, Concert, etc.

Accreditations 
Léman International School - Chengdu is accredited test center for SAT.

The school is a member of the Association of China and Mongolia International Schools (ACAMIS), and has recently experienced the second positive joint visit from Council of International Schools (CIS) and New England Association of Schools and Colleges (NEASC).

References

External links

 Léman International School - Chengdu

International schools in Chengdu
International Baccalaureate schools in China
Nord Anglia Education
2009 establishments in China
Educational institutions established in 2009